Sheikh Humaid bin Rashid Al Nuaimi III (born 1 January 1931) is the ruler of the emirate of Ajman and a member of the UAE Supreme Council of the Union. He is the 10th ruler of Ajman. Humaid bin Rashid succeeded his late father Sheikh Rashid bin Humaid Al Nuaimi III on 6 September 1981. He previously served as deputy ruler since 1960. In addition to all his accomplishments his highness Sheikh Humaid bin Rashid Al Nuaimi has a predicted net worth of 1.9 billion USD

In 2019 he ranked 11th on the list of the longest-reigning rulers in the world (if Elizabeth II is counted in many realms), which makes him sixth today.

Early life and family
Humaid bin Rashid received his early education in Dubai in the 1940s and 1950s and later went to Cairo for further studies. In the early 1970s he became active in the affairs of state, as Ajman joined the United Arab Emirates in December 1971 and he was required to act as the deputy ruler. He belongs to the Al Na'im tribe.

His sister was the late Sheikha Fatima bint Rashid Al Nuaimi, who died on 14 December 2014. Her only son is the ruler of Fujairah, Sheikh Hamad Al Sharqi.

One of the spouses of Humaid bin Rashid is Sheikha Fatima bint Zayed. His child from this marriage is Rashid bin Humaid Al Nuaimi.

His children include:
Sheikh Ammar bin Humaid Al Nuaimi, Crown Prince and President of the Executive Board (born 1969).
Sheikh Ahmed bin Humaid Al Nuaimi, Chairman of the Economic Department.
Sheikh Abdulaziz bin Humaid Al Nuaimi, Chairman of the Department of Culture and Information.
Sheikh Rashid bin Humaid Al Nuaimi IV, Chairman of Ajman Municipality and Planning and Chief of Ajman Club, head of R Holding and the owner of City University College of Ajman, President of  UEFA (UAE Football Association)
Sheikha Aisha bint Humaid Al Nuaimi
Sheikha Fatima bint Humaid Al Nuaimi

Education 
Humaid bin Rashid received his early education in Dubai in the 1940s and 1950s and later went to Cairo for further studies.

Emiri Decrees in Ajman 
Al Nuaimi issued on 11 September 2021 Emiri Decree No. 9, establishing the Protocol and Hospitality Department in the Emirate of Ajman. The decree includes 15 articles after the definitions, and the department will be located in the Emiri Court. Under the decree, the newly-establishment department will directly report to the Crown Prince of Ajman, Ammar bin Humaid Al Nuaimi. The department is tasked with providing hospitality for the Ruler of Ajman, the Crown Prince and members of the ruling family, as well as their guests, in accordance with the local and international standards.

In March 2020, he issued Emiri decree No. 6 changing the name of the Central Department for Legal Affairs of the Ajman Government into the “Department of Legal Affairs of Ajman Government.”

Philanthropic Efforts 
Al Nuaimi announced in May 2020 sponsoring six Sudanese children after their parents died of COVID-19. He pledged to pay for their living expenses, schooling, and social expenses. He also helps his country with education.

References

1931 births
Living people
Sheikhs of the Emirate of Ajman
History of the United Arab Emirates